The Greater Egyptian Conference is a high school athletic conference represented by 8 schools in the south-eastern portion of Illinois, US. It is a member of the Illinois High School Association.

The conference offers championships for girls in basketball, softball, and volleyball. In boys' sports, the GEC offers championships in baseball and basketball.

Current members

References

External links
. Illinois High School Association (Illinois High School Association)

Illinois high school sports conferences